is a passenger railway station located in the city of Matsuyama, Ehime Prefecture, Japan. It is operated by the private transportation company Iyotetsu.

Lines
During most of the day, railway trains arrive every fifteen minutes. Trains continue from Matsuyama City Station on the Yokogawara Line to Yokogawara Station.

Layout
Mitsu Station is an above-ground station with one island platform and one side platform connected by a level crossing. The side platform is normally closed and is used on a temporary basis for events such as the Mitsuhama Fireworks Festival.
There is a connecting track near Yamanishi Station, and in the event of an accident resulting in injury or death or signal trouble on the Takahama Line, the train will return to this station or Furumachi Station.

History
Mitsu Station was opened on 28 October 1888.

Surrounding area
Mitsuhama Station
 Mitsuhama Port 
 Matsuyama City Hall Mitsuhama Branch

See also
 List of railway stations in Japan

References

External links

Iyotetsu Station Information

Iyotetsu Takahama Line
Railway stations in Ehime Prefecture
Railway stations in Japan opened in 1888
Railway stations in Matsuyama, Ehime